John of Sweden - Swedish: Johan, Jon and Hans - may refer to:

John I, King of Sweden 1216
John II, King of Sweden 1497
John III, King of Sweden 1569
John, Swedish prince, died 1152, son of King Sweartgar I
John, Swedish prince, died 1205, son of King Canute I
John, prince and heir apparent 1520, son of King Christian II
John, Duke of Östergötland, Swedish prince 1589
John II Casimir Vasa, pretender to the Swedish throne as of 1609
John Casimir, Count Palatine of Kleeburg, Swedish prince 1652